The Semevolos Farm near Butte, North Dakota, United States, is a farm that was homesteaded by John and Rose Semevolos in 1903, and one or more of its buildings were developed in 1906.  It was listed on the National Register of Historic Places in 1987.

According to its nomination, the Semevolos house is architecturally significant "as a near 'textbook' example of one of two identified Ukrainian immigrant building types."  It has a blue door.

The main houses roof has caved in and everything has been boarded up.

References

Buildings and structures completed in 1906
Farms on the National Register of Historic Places in North Dakota
Ukrainian-American culture in North Dakota
National Register of Historic Places in McLean County, North Dakota
1906 establishments in North Dakota